Silluvia gogona is a species of beetle in family Scarabaeidae.

Scarabaeidae
Beetles described in 1977